Aisha Abubakar is a Nigerian politician. Following the 2015 Nigerian general elections, she was appointed as the Minister of State for Industry, Trade and Investment by President Muhammadu Buhari in 2015.

Early life and education 
Hajiya Aisha Abubakar was born on July 20, 1966 in Dogondaji, Sokoto State. She is the daughter of a former finance minister, Abubakar Alhaji. She had her secondary education at Queens College, Lagos between 1978-84. She got her first degree from University of Warwick, obtaining a Bachelor of Arts in Politics and International Studies between 1987-90. She also earned a Master of Art degree in Development Studies from University of Leeds between 1990 and 1991. She was also appointed to oversee the women affairs as Mrs Aisha Alhassan resigns and will still maintains her position as the Minister of State for Industry, Trade and Investment.

Political career 
Abubakar worked at African Development Bank between 1993-99. She was later appointed Minister of State for Industry, Trade and Investment in November 2015. In October 2017, she supervised the hiring of an appraising agency by The Bank of Industry (BOI), Nigerian Export-Import Bank and some other government parastatals. During the signing of the MoU, she explained that the aim of the agency was to alleviate the funding of small and medium enterprises in the country. In the same year, she opined that due to renewed interest of government in the agricultural sector, Nigeria's cocoa production will increase by 50% in 2021.

Abubakar has also advocated for the unity of Nigeria through diversification across different parts of the country, explaining that educational institutions should build individuals that will aid this diversification. To commemorate International Women's Day 2017, Abubakar empowered 200 women in her home state through resources and skills on new methods of utilizing agricultural produce.

References 

1966 births
Living people
Alumni of the University of Warwick
Buhari administration personnel
Politicians from Sokoto State
Federal ministers of Nigeria
Women government ministers of Nigeria